These lists show the audio and visual recordings of the opera L'Orfeo by Claudio Monteverdi. The opera was first performed in Mantua in 1607, at the court of Duke Vincenzo Gonzaga, and is one of the earliest of all operas. The first recording of L'Orfeo was issued in 1939, a freely adapted version of Monteverdi's music edited by Giacomo Benvenuti, given by the orchestra of La Scala Milan conducted by Ferrucio Calusio. In 1949 the Berlin Radio Orchestra under Helmut Koch recorded the complete opera,  on long-playing records (LPs). The advent of LP recordings was, as Harold Schonberg later wrote, an important factor in the postwar revival of interest in Renaissance  and Baroque music, and from the mid-1950s recordings of L'Orfeo have been issued on many labels. Koch's landmark version was reissued in 1962, when it was compared unfavourably with others that had by then been issued. The 1969 recording by Nicholas Harnoncourt and the Vienna Concentus Musicus, using Harnoncourt's edition based on period instruments, was praised for "making Monteverdi's music sound something like the way he imagined". In 1981 Siegfried Heinrich, with the Early Music Studio of the Hesse Chamber Orchestra, recorded a version which re-created the original Striggio libretto ending, adding music from Monteverdi's 1616 ballet Tirsi e Clori for the Bacchante scenes. Among more recent recordings, that of Emmanuelle Haïm has been praised for its dramatic effect. The 21st century has seen the issue of an increasing number of recordings on DVD.

Audio

Video

References
Notes

Sources

Orfeo